Miller Airport  is a privately owned, public-use airport six miles northeast of Alliance, in Mahoning County, Ohio. It is closed indefinitely.

Facilities

There is no Fixed-base operator, but Grade 100LL Gasoline (low lead blue) is available.  Tie-down, and hangars are accessible, and glider service, flight instruction, aircraft rental, and glider towing service.

In the year ending June 24, 2011 the airport had 3,484 aircraft operations, average 67 per week: 71% local general aviation and 29% transient general aviation.

Incidents and accidents
 On 1 September 2007 a Schweizer SGS 2-33A glider, N65832, was damaged beyond repair due to its pilot's inattentiveness during preflight. This caused the altimeter to be incorrectly reset, causing the pilot to release tow 1,000 feet lower than where he thought he was. The glider struck the tops of trees upon final approach.

References

External links 
 

Airports in Ohio
Buildings and structures in Mahoning County, Ohio
Transportation in Mahoning County, Ohio